Behind the Museum Café is a cafe with two locations in Portland, Oregon.

Description 

The original cafe, located west of the Portland Art Museum serves coffee, tea and Japanese small plates, including baguette sandwiches, sweets, onigiri, and otsumami. The drink menu includes espresso, iced coffees, lattes, and other milk drinks; tea options include matcha and hōjicha lattes. A second location in the former Guild Theatre serves  matcha and homemade sweets.

Walker MacMurdo of Willamette Week described the cafe as "inconspicuous" and "a microcosm of Japanese culture: a one-stop shop for imported antiques and kimonos and contemporary ceramics, pottery, calligraphy and art in the Japanese tradition". The newspaper has said, "Antique jewelry boxes, kimonos and kokeshi dolls line the walls, and the mix of PSU students, museumgoers and fortunate wanderers seated within are never in a rush to leave."

History 
The original Behind the Museum opened in a former Boyd's cafe in 2011. In 2019, owner Tomoe Horibuchi confirmed plans to open a second location called Book of Tea Café in the Japanese bookstore Kinokuniya, within the former Guild Theatre. The second location opened on August 21, 2019.

Reception 
In The Oregonian's 2017 list of "Downtown Portland's 10 best coffee shops", Samantha Bakall described the Behind the Museum as "a serene, almost monastic coffee shop lined with Japanese art and ceramics" and wrote, "Behind the Museum Cafe is one of our favorite cafes in the city. With its high, airy ceilings and lengthy menu of Japanese teas, temple-style snacks and Extracto coffee drinks, it's the perfect place to have a relaxing cup of matcha or catch up on work." Seiji Nanbu included the cafe in Eater Portland's 2020 list of "Where to Find Mesmerizing Matcha Treats in Portland and Beyond". The business was also included in Eater Portland's 2022 overview of "Where to Eat and Drink in Downtown Portland".

See also
 List of Japanese restaurants

References

External links 

 
 
 Behind the Museum Café at Zomato

2011 establishments in Oregon
Japanese restaurants in Portland, Oregon
Restaurants established in 2011
Southwest Portland, Oregon